Runaway Love may refer to:

Runaway Love (EP), an EP by En Vogue
"Runaway Love" (En Vogue song), the title song
"Runaway Love" (Firefall song)
"Runaway Love" (Ludacris song)
"Runaway Love" (Linda Clifford (song)
"Runaway Love", a song by Justin Bieber
"Runaway Love", a song by Alice Gold